The Nyanza barb (Enteromius nyanzae) is a species of cyprinid fish.

It is found in Kenya, Rwanda, Tanzania, and Uganda.

Its natural habitats are rivers, freshwater lakes, freshwater marshes, and inland deltas. It is not considered a threatened species by the IUCN.

References

Enteromius
Cyprinid fish of Africa
Taxa named by Peter James Palmer Whitehead
Fish described in 1960
Taxonomy articles created by Polbot